Raimo Pajusalu (born 1 February 1981) is a former Estonian volleyball player. He was a member of the Estonian national team from 2000 to 2014 and represented his country at the 2009 and 2011 European Volleyball Championships.

Pajusalu started his professional career in hometown club ESS Falck Pärnu. He has also played in Austria, Belgium and France.

Sporting achievements

Clubs
MEVZA Cup
  2005/2006 – with Hypo Tirol Innsbruck

National championship
 1998/1999  Estonian Championship, with ESS Pärnu
 1999/2000  Estonian Championship, with ESS Pärnu
 2000/2001  Estonian Championship, with ESS Pärnu
 2001/2002  Estonian Championship, with ESS Pärnu
 2002/2003  Estonian Championship, with ESS Pärnu
 2003/2004  Estonian Championship, with ESS Falck Pärnu
 2004/2005  Estonian Championship, with Audentes Tallinn
 2005/2006  Austrian Championship, with Hypo Tirol Innsbruck
 2006/2007  Belgian Championship, with Knack Randstad Roeselare
 2007/2008  Belgian Championship, with Knack Randstad Roeselare
 2008/2009  Belgian Championship, with Knack Randstad Roeselare

National cup
 1998/1999  Estonian Cup 1998, with ESS Pärnu
 1999/2000  Estonian Cup 1999, with ESS Pärnu
 2000/2001  Estonian Cup 2000, with ESS Pärnu
 2001/2002  Estonian Cup 2001, with ESS Pärnu
 2002/2003  Estonian Cup 2002, with ESS Pärnu
 2003/2004  Estonian Cup 2003, with ESS Falck Pärnu
 2004/2005  Estonian Cup 2004, with Audentes Tallinn
 2005/2006  Austrian Cup 2006, with Hypo Tirol Innsbruck
 2006/2007  Belgian Cup 2007, with Knack Randstad Roeselare
 2007/2008  Belgian Cup 2008, with Knack Randstad Roeselare
 2008/2009  Belgian SuperCup 2008, with Knack Randstad Roeselare
 2011/2012  French Cup 2012, with Rennes Volley 35
 2012/2013  French SuperCup 2012, with Rennes Volley 35

Individual
 2006 Estonian Volleyball Player of the Year
 2007 Estonian Volleyball Player of the Year
 2008 Estonian Volleyball Player of the Year

Personal
His younger sister Kaisa is a former Estonian rower, who won a bronze medal at the European Championships in 2012.

References

External links

 Player profile on the FIVB official site

1981 births
Living people
Sportspeople from Pärnu
Estonian men's volleyball players
Estonian expatriate volleyball players
Estonian expatriate sportspeople in Austria
Expatriate volleyball players in Austria
Estonian expatriate sportspeople in Belgium
Expatriate volleyball players in Belgium
Estonian expatriate sportspeople in France
Expatriate volleyball players in France